Ullrich Hall is a historic building on the campus of University of Wisconsin-Platteville in Platteville, Wisconsin.

History
The building was originally built in 1916 as the Agriculture and Manual Arts Building as part of the Platteville State Normal School. The hall contained a forge room, a farm carpentry room, a dairy lab, a stock judging room, a gym, etc. The specialized training it allowed was a milestone in the state normal school system. Now known as Ullrich Hall, it is the oldest remaining academic building of what is now the University of Wisconsin-Platteville.

It was listed on the National Register of Historic Places in 1985 and on the State Register of Historic Places in 1989.

References

School buildings on the National Register of Historic Places in Wisconsin
National Register of Historic Places in Grant County, Wisconsin
University of Wisconsin–Platteville
Education in Grant County, Wisconsin
Neoclassical architecture in Wisconsin
School buildings completed in 1916
1916 establishments in Wisconsin